The South Dakota–South Dakota State football rivalry (also the South Dakota Showdown Series) between the South Dakota Coyotes and the South Dakota State Jackrabbits is a yearly rivalry match-up in football between the two largest public universities in the state of South Dakota: the University of South Dakota in Vermillion and South Dakota State University in Brookings.

History
South Dakota and South Dakota State are both members of the Missouri Valley Football Conference in the FCS. The football series began in 1889 and has been played a total of 114 times as of 2018. Previously, both schools were long-time members of the Division II North Central Conference where the rivalry game played almost yearly. With the upgrade of both programs to Division I FCS (SDSU in 2004 and USD in 2008), the rivalry halted between 2003 until 2012. The series has returned to being a yearly game with both teams playing each other as part of MVFC play. Since 2012, the game has traditionally been played in the last week of the season in November. It is also the oldest rivalry in college football, between two public universities, in the same state, that have a game named "University of _ vs. _ State University."

Stadiums
The majority of the series' games have been played in either team's home stadiums in Vermillion (South Dakota) or Brookings (South Dakota State). Three games (1919, 1920, and 1933) played on a neutral field in Sioux Falls. Since the 1979 season, the Coyotes have hosted their games at the DakotaDome (9,100 seats); previously, they played at Darwin Inman Memorial Stadium. The Jackrabbits played home games at Coughlin–Alumni Stadium from 1962 until the 2015 season. South Dakota State's football team has played in its new stadium Dana J. Dykhouse Stadium (19,340 seats) since 2016.

Game results
The numbers represent what national ranking each team was at the time of the game.

See also 
 List of NCAA college football rivalry games
 List of most-played college football series in NCAA Division I

References

External links 
 South Dakota Showdown Series

College football rivalries in the United States
South Dakota Coyotes football
South Dakota State Jackrabbits football
1889 establishments in South Dakota